Royden may refer to:

People

Surname
 Halsey Royden (1928–1993), American mathematician
 Marmaduke Roydon or Royden (1583–1646), English merchant-adventurer and colonial planter, also a Royalist army officer
 Maude Royden (1876–1956), English preacher and suffragist
 Thomas Royden (disambiguation), several people

Given name

 Royden Barrie (1890–1948), pseudonym of Rodney Bennett, father of British composer Richard Rodney Bennett
 Royden B. Davis (1923/1924–2002), American academic administrator
 Royden G. Derrick (1915–2009), American industrialist and general authority of The Church of Jesus Christ of Latter-day Saints
 Roy Dyson (Royden Patrick Dyson, born 1948), American politician
 Royden Ingham (1911–1999), American cyclist who competed at the 1932 Summer Olympics
 Royden Lam (born 1975), Hong Kong darts player
 Royden Loewen (born 1954), Canadian historian
 Royden Rabinowitch (born 1943), Canadian sculptor
 Roy Screech (Clive Royden Screech, born 1953), Anglican bishop 
 Royden Yerkes (1881–1964). American Episcopal priest and theologian

Other uses
 Royden baronets
 Royden Park, Frankby, within the Metropolitan Borough of Wirral, England
 Thomas Royden & Sons, a shipbuilding company in Liverpool 1818–1893

See also
 Roydon (disambiguation)